Richard Kurt Johnson (born 4 July 1979) is a former English cricketer.  Johnson was a left-handed batsman who bowled right-arm fast.  He was born at Croydon, Surrey.

Johnson represented the Surrey Cricket Board in 3 List A matches, the first of which came against Lincolnshire in the 2nd round of the 2002 Cheltenham & Gloucester Trophy which was played in 2001.  His final 2 List A matches came against the Gloucestershire Cricket Board and the Essex Cricket Board in the 1st and 2nd rounds of the 2003 Cheltenham & Gloucester Trophy which were held in 2002.  In his 3 List A matches, he scored 24 runs at a batting average of 12.00, with a high score of 12*.  In the field he took a single catch.

References

External links
Richard Johnson at Cricinfo
Richard Johnson at CricketArchive

1979 births
Living people
Cricketers from Croydon
English cricketers
Surrey Cricket Board cricketers